The Sir Ernest MacMillan family home is a Toronto heritage property located at 115 Park Road, in the Rosedale neighbourhood of Toronto, Ontario, Canada. It was the family home of Sir Ernest and Lady MacMillan (née Elsie Keith), and it was constructed during 1931 and 1932.

In 1931, MacMillan and his wife commissioned Page and Steele architects of Toronto for the construction of a new home at 115 Park Road.

The family home was later designated a Heritage Property, as adopted by Toronto City Council, on January 22, 1979. The house is also included in the South Rosedale Heritage Conservation District. South Rosedale was designated as a Heritage Conservation District under Part V of the Ontario Heritage Act, and also enacted by Toronto City Council, on February 7, 2003.

References

External links
115 Park Road, Toronto, Ontario. Located in South Rosedale Heritage Conservation District 6 (enacted 2003): City of Toronto, Heritage Preservation Services.

  Historic property listing for 115 Park Road, Toronto, constructed c. 1931-1932 for Sir Ernest and Lady MacMillan. [Located in City of Toronto, South Rosedale Heritage Conservation District, (enacted 2003)]. Source: City of Toronto, Heritage Preservation Services.
  South Rosedale Heritage Conservation District Study. Toronto, Ontario: South Rosedale Ratepayers’ Association (SRRA), November 2002. [pdf file]
  Toronto Downtown Heritage Conservation Districts 1-8. [South Rosedale is Heritage Conservation District 6].
  Heritage listing for 115 Park Road in South Rosedale Ratepayers Association (SRRA) Heritage Properties Database.  [To see the listing for 115 Park Road, type "115" for Street Number, "Park Road" for Street Name, and click "Search".  Then, click on the blue/orange colored icon shown at 115 Park Road for a contemporary photo of the house].

City of Toronto Heritage Properties
Houses in Toronto
Houses completed in 1932